Ananda Bhairavi is a 1983 Indian bilingual dance film, simultaneously shot in Telugu and Kannada languages, written, and directed by Jandhyala. It starred Girish Karnad, Kathak dancer Malavika Sarkar, Rajesh Kumar and  "Natyacharya" Bhagavathula Venkata Rama Sarma as a male classical dancer in this film. The film was premiered at International Film Festival of India. The film received positive reviews and has garnered the four state Nandi Awards.

Plot
This is a movie which gives you knowledge about the origin of Kuchipudi dance. It is about people who considered a girl performing "Kuchipudi" dance an embarrassment and about a man who is fighting tooth and nail to pass on the heritage of "Kuchipudi". He finally manages to find a girl who he trains in "Kuchipudi". As girls learning Kuchipudi were not accepted in that era, he gets outcast from his caste, place and also the religious places.

Cast
 Girish Karnad (S. P. Balasubrahmanyam as the Telugu dubbed voice)
 Kanchana
 Rajesh as Anand Sharma
 Hema Sundar

Soundtrack
Telugu:
 "Brahmanjali" - S. P. Balasubrahmanyam
 "Pilichina Muraliki" - S. P. Balasubrahmanyam, S. Janaki
 "Koluvaitiva Ranga Saayi" - S. P. Balasubrahmanyam, S. Janaki
 "Chaitramu Kusumaanjali" - S. P. Balasubrahmanyam
 "Ra Ragamai" - S. P. Balasubrahmanyam

Kannada:
 "Brahmanjali" - S. P. Balasubrahmanyam
 "Haaduva Muraliya" - S. P. Balasubrahmanyam, Vani Jairam
 "Malagiruveya Ranganatha" - S. P. Balasubrahmanyam, S. Janaki
 "Chaitrada Kusumaanjali" - S. P. Balasubrahmanyam
 "Baa Baa Ba Raagavagi" - S. P. Balasubrahmanyam

Awards
Nandi Awards - 1983
 Best Feature Film - Gold - Bhupal Reddy & Seetha Padmaraju (1983)
 Best Director - Jandhyala
 Second Best Story Writer - K. S. Chandra Murthy
 Best Cinematographer - S. Gopal Reddy

Filmfare Awards South
 Filmfare Award for Best Actor - Kannada - Girish Karnad

References

External links
 

1983 films
1980s Telugu-language films
1980s Kannada-language films
1980s romantic musical films
1980s romantic comedy-drama films
1983 multilingual films
Indian multilingual films
Indian dance films
1980s dance films
Indian romantic comedy-drama films
1980s musical comedy-drama films
Films about the arts
Indian romantic musical films
Films about social issues in India
Indian nonlinear narrative films
Films directed by Jandhyala
Films scored by Ramesh Naidu
Films about the caste system in India
Indian musical comedy-drama films
1983 comedy films
1983 drama films